Jalan Bukit Bintang is a major road in Kuala Lumpur, Malaysia. It is a popular shopping strip providing access to the Bukit Bintang neighbourhood.

List of junctions along the road

References 

Roads in Kuala Lumpur